The following highways are numbered 272:

Canada
Manitoba Provincial Road 272
Prince Edward Island Route 272

Japan
 Japan National Route 272

United States
 Connecticut Route 272
 Georgia State Route 272
 Kentucky Route 272
 Maryland Route 272
 Minnesota State Highway 272 (former)
 Montana Secondary Highway 272
 New Mexico State Road 272
 New York State Route 272
 Pennsylvania Route 272
 Tennessee State Route 272
 Texas State Highway 272 (former)
 Texas State Highway Spur 272
 Farm to Market Road 272 (Texas)
 Utah State Route 272 (former)
 Virginia State Route 272
 Washington State Route 272
 Wyoming Highway 272